Ian Mitchell is a Scottish author, who grew up mainly in South Africa. He is the author of Isles of the West: a Hebridean Voyage and Isles of the North: a Voyage to the Realms of the Norse. Both books are concerned with apparently-virtuous environmental NGOs which operate in rural Scotland but which, in the point of view of the author, actually do damage to it. Mitchell is a critic of bodies like the Royal Society for the Protection of Birds and Scottish Natural Heritage, and has compared aspects of their behavior to that of the Nazis.

Mitchell was founder and director of an organisation called "People Too," described by him as an "organisation founded to defend rural communities from the imposts of centralized bureaucracy."

Mitchell has also written a book called The Cost of a Reputation, about the Aldington-Tolstoy libel trial which took place in London in 1989 and concerned the claims that a controversial British Army operation in May 1945 handed back tens of thousands of Cossack and Yugoslav refugees from Stalin and Tito, for the most part illegally, to the dictators. The book mainly concerned the London trial, at which (Mitchell claims) Lord Aldington, who had issued the illegal orders in 1945 as Staff Brigadier, perjured himself. In this, as an ex-Deputy Chairman of the Conservative Party, he was assisted by both the Foreign Office and the Ministry of Defense.

Mitchell lived for fifteen years on the Hebridean island of Islay, where he has three children. He now lives in Moscow, where he works as a journalist and has broadcast about books on the Voice of Russia. On 6 April 2007 he delivered a lecture "Seeing Scotland: Historical Places and Themes" at the ELE public forum in Moscow.

Publications

References

Living people
Year of birth missing (living people)
Alumni of St John's College (Johannesburg)